Crime and Punishment (Swedish: Brott och straff) is a 1945 Swedish drama film directed by Hampe Faustman and starring Faustman, Gunn Wållgren,  Sigurd Wallén and Elsie Albiin. It was shot at the Centrumateljéerna Studios in Stockholm. The film's sets were designed by the art director Harald Garmland. It is an adaptation of the 1866 novel Crime and Punishment by Fyodor Dostoevsky.

Cast
 Hampe Faustman as 	Raskolnikov
 Gunn Wållgren as 	Sonja
 Sigurd Wallén as Samiotov
 Elsie Albiin as 	Dunja
 Georg Funkquist as 	Lusjin
 Tekla Sjöblom as 	Modern
 Toivo Pawlo as 	Rasumikin
 Elsa Widborg as 	Aljona
 Hugo Björne as Marmeladov
 Lisskulla Jobs as 	Katarina
 Harriett Philipson as 	Natascha
 Bengt Ekerot as Studenten
 Magnus Kesster as 	Polisofficeren
 Josua Bengtson as Constable

References

Bibliography 
 Sundholm, John . Historical Dictionary of Scandinavian Cinema. Scarecrow Press, 2012.

External links 
 

1945 films
1945 drama films
1940s Swedish-language films
Films directed by Hampe Faustman
Films set in the 19th century
Films set in Saint Petersburg
Swedish historical drama films
1940s historical drama films
Films based on Crime and Punishment
1940s Swedish films